The phrase Tre, Pol and Pen is used to describe people from or places in Cornwall, UK. The full rhyming couplet runs: By Tre Pol and Pen / Shall ye know all Cornishmen, a version of which was recorded by Richard Carew in his Survey of Cornwall, published in 1602. Many Cornish surnames and place names still retain these words as prefixes, such as the surname Trelawny and the village Polzeath. Tre in the Cornish language means a settlement or homestead; Pol, a pond, lake or well; and Pen (also Welsh and Cumbric), a hill or headland. Cornish surnames and placenames are generally pronounced with the emphasis on the second syllable.

Examples in Cornish surnames
Squire Trelawney, character in Treasure Island
Sir Jonathan Trelawny, 3rd Baronet
Petroc Trelawny
Arthur Tremayne
Henry Trengrouse
John Trevaskis
Marcus Trescothick
Richard Trevithick
Richard Trevithick Tangye
Ross Poldark, fictional character in series of the same name
James Polkinghorne
Richard Polwhele
Edward William Wynne Pendarves
David Penhaligon
Charles Penrose
Guy Penrose Gibson
Dolly Pentreath
Sir Humphrey Pengallan, character in Jamaica Inn

Examples in Cornish places
Trethevy
Trematon
Tregony
Polzeath
Polperro
Penzance
Penryn
Penponds

See also

Cornish surnames
Cornish language

References

Cornish-language surnames
Cornish words and phrases